Uroš I may refer to:

 Uroš I, Grand Prince of Serbia, Grand Prince of Serbia (1112-1145)
 Stefan Uroš I, King of Serbia (1243-1276)

See also
 Uroš II (disambiguation)
 Stefan Uroš (disambiguation)
 Uroš Nemanjić (disambiguation)
 Uroš Vukanović (disambiguation)
 Serbia (disambiguation)